Criticism of desktop Linux is a history of comment on the perceived shortcomings of the Linux operating system when installed on desktop computers. These criticisms have been aimed at the plethora of issues and lack of consistency between Linux distributions, their usefulness and ease of use as desktop systems for general end users, driver support and issues with multi-media playback and audio development.

While smartphones running the Linux-based Android mobile operating system dominate the smartphone market, and Linux is used on most servers, as of 2021 exclusively run on the world's 500 fastest supercomputers, and is used on the New York Stock Exchange, Linux-based operating systems have failed to achieve widespread adoption on personal computers.

Viability of Linux as a desktop system

Linus Torvalds has expressed that he intended the Linux kernel to be used in desktop operating systems. He argues that Android is widely used because it comes pre-installed on new phones, and that Linux distributions would need to be bundled on new computers to gain market share.

Linux has been criticized for a number of reasons, including lack of user-friendliness and having a steep learning curve, being inadequate for desktop use, lacking support for some hardware, having a relatively small games library, lacking native versions of widely used applications. 

Some critics do not believe Linux will ever gain a large share in the desktop market. In May 2009 Preston Gralla, contributing editor to Computerworld.com, believed that Linux would never be important to desktop/notebook users, even though he felt it was simple and straightforward to use, but that its low usage was indicative of its low importance in the desktop market.

In his essay Luxury of Ignorance: An Open-Source Horror Story, Eric S. Raymond stated that the lack of usability in many open-source and Linux tools is not from lack of manuals but from a lack of thought about the users' experience.

James Donald from Princeton University analyzed shared library concepts of several operating systems. In his 2003 paper titled Improved Portability of Shared Libraries, he worried about the lack of a Windows Application Compatibility Group equivalent.

Missed opportunities
Desktop Linux was criticized in late 2010 for having missed its opportunity to become a significant force in desktop computing. PC World executive editor Robert Strohmeyer commented that although Linux has exceptional security and stability, as well as great performance and usability, the time for desktop Linux to succeed has been missed. Nick Farrell, writing for TechEye, felt that the release of the poorly-received Windows Vista was a missed opportunity to grab significant market share.

Both critics indicated that Linux did not fail on the desktop due to being  "too geeky," "too hard to use," or "too obscure". Both had praise for distributions, Strohmeyer saying "the best-known distribution, Ubuntu, has received high marks for usability from every major player in the technology press". Both laid the blame for this failure on the open-source community. Strohmeyer named the "fierce ideology of the open-source community at large" as being responsible, while Farrell stated "The biggest killer of putting penguin software on the desktop was the Linux community. If you think the Apple fanboys are completely barking, they are role models of sanity to the loudmouthed Open Sauce religious loonies who are out there. Like many fundamentalists they are totally inflexible — waving a GNU as if it were handed down by God to Richard Stallman".

The accusation of over-zealous advocacy has been dealt with previously; in 2006 Dominic Humphries stated that the aims of the Linux
community are not desktop market-share or popularity, but in Linux being the best operating system that can be made for the community.

Criticisms

Choice and fragmentation
A criticism often leveled against Linux is the abundance of distributions available. As of January 2022, DistroWatch lists 239 active distributions. Critics cite the large number as cause for confusion to prospective users and argue it is a factor preventing the widespread adoption of Linux on consumer desktops. Alexander Wolfe wrote in InformationWeek:

Along with the argument that forking and the resulting fragmentation divides and wastes development efforts and resources, it is asserted that with the lack of standardization between distributions for software libraries, package managers, configurations, as well as the varied desktop environments, the resulting incompatibilities also make it more difficult for application developers and software maintainers since applications have to be adapted to run on each distribution or family of distributions. This fragmentation also complicates software installation, forcing non-technical users who cannot build applications from source and resolve dependency issues by themselves to rely on precompiled packages from distribution-specific software repositories, which have a more or less limited selection of applications and typically lag behind the latest releases as the software has to be picked up by the software maintainer and packaged to run on the specific distribution and release. Caitlyn Martin from LinuxDevCenter wrote critically on the lack of standardization and compatibility between distributions:

However, Linux advocates have defended the large number of distributions as promoting of freedom of choice and describe the diversity as a key strength. Jim Lynch from InfoWorld wrote:

Attempts have been made to standardize Linux distributions through the Linux Standard Base in order to make software more compatible across distributions; however, it had very limited adoption. Projects such as AppImage, Flatpak, and Snappy are seeking to remedy the issue of software fragmentation by instead packaging applications with all the required dependencies to enable them to run as portable applications independent of the libraries, configuration and idiosyncrasies of a particular distribution, but even this approach has been criticized of fragmentation.

Third-party application development
Linux desktop operating systems are criticized for the difficulty of developing third-party applications for the platforms, with distribution fragmentation, insistence on using shared libraries instead of including the libraries with the application, and lack of concern given to keeping APIs consistent and backwards compatible being cited as factors. This particularly causes difficulties for closed-source applications, which are distributed exclusively as binaries, since the burden of ensuring compatibility with the myriad of Linux distributions and release versions is borne solely by the developer. Dirk Hohndel, VMware's Chief Open Source Officer, criticized the lack of standardization across distributions for creating an unfriendly environment for application development, writing that it "basically tells app developers ‘go away, focus on platforms that care about applications. Miguel de Icaza, founder of the GNOME desktop environment, regards the disregard of backwards compatibility as a cultural issue with the Linux development community:

Tony Mobily, editor of Free Software Magazine, identified problems in the server roots of Linux in his article 2009: software installation in GNU/Linux is still broken – and a path to fixing it:

In August 2014 on the DebConf in Portland Linus Torvalds also voiced his unhappiness with the binary application packaging for the Linux distro ecosystem:

Audio development
The lack of strong API standards for multimedia has been criticised. For example, the Adobe Systems development blog penguin.SWF discusses the complicated Linux audio infrastructure in the analysis Welcome to the jungle. The nearly one dozen actively supported systems are called an audio jungle.

PulseAudio main developer Lennart Poettering stated that it is very difficult for programmers to know which audio API to use for which purpose.

Driver support
Linux has in the past been criticized for a lack of driver support; however, this was largely due to manufacturers not supporting the Linux system. It wasn't until 2004 that ATI started development of Linux drivers.  Major adoption of Linux in servers and Android has encouraged driver development for Linux.

Wireless support
Wireless driver support has been a problem area for Linux. At one time many drivers were missing and users were required to use solutions such as ndiswrapper, which utilizes drivers made for the Windows operating system. Broadcom was particularly criticized for not releasing drivers. This issue was also worked around by extracting proprietary firmware for use on Linux. Broadcom has since released free and open-source drivers for the Linux kernel, eliminating the issues for modern Broadcom chipsets.

The problem has been largely fixed in recent years and there are now a fairly large number of drivers, adding support to most wireless cards available today. However, many features are still missing from these drivers, mostly due to manufacturers not providing specifications and documentation, and thus forcing developers to reverse engineer cards.

Directory structure
The traditional directory structure, which is a heritage from Linux's Unix roots in the 1970s, has been criticized as inappropriate for desktop end users. In particular, the Linux directory structure is criticized for scattering application-specific components in different system directories instead of keeping them in a common application-specific directory. Some Linux distributions like GoboLinux and moonOS have proposed alternative hierarchies that were argued to be easier for end users, though such proposals have achieved little acceptance.

See also
 Criticism of Linux
 Linux on the desktop

References

Linux Desktop
Linux